Robert Dale "Bob" Hull (born December 28, 1954) is an American politician. A Democrat, he was elected to the Virginia House of Delegates in a December 1992 special election. He represented the 38th district, made up of part of Fairfax County.

Bob Hull was challenged by Kaye Kory, who represented Mason District on the Fairfax County School Board, in the June 9, 2009 primary for the Democratic nomination in the 38th House of Delegates district (Fairfax County - Mason and Providence magisterial districts) and lost the election by a narrow margin.

Notes

References

External links

Blue Virginia Interview with candidates

Project Vote Smart - Representative Robert Dale 'Bob' Hull (VA) profile
Follow the Money - Robert D (Bob) Hull
2005 2003 2001 1999 campaign contributions
Washington Post - Robert D. Hull local election 2008 profile

1954 births
Living people
Virginia Tech alumni
Democratic Party members of the Virginia House of Delegates
Northern Virginia Community College alumni
People from Fairfax County, Virginia
21st-century American politicians